Chun-hwa is a Korean feminine given name. Its meaning differs based on the hanja used to write each syllable of the name.

Hanja
There are four hanja with the reading "chun" and 15 hanja with the reading "hwa" on the South Korean government's official list of hanja which may be used in given names. Some ways of writing this name in hanja include:

 (봄 춘 bom chun, 빛날 화 binnal hwa): "spring splendour"
 (봄 춘 bom chun, 꽃 화 ggot hwa): "spring flower"

People
People with this name include:
Kim Chun-hwa (born 1974), North Korean short track speed skater
Ryang Chun-Hwa (born 1991), North Korean weightlifter 
Pak Chun-hwa, North Korean official, chairwoman of Ripsok Cooperative Farm in Sungho County, North Hwanghae

Fictional characters with this name include:
Ha Chun-hwa, in 2011 South Korean film Sunny

See also
List of Korean given names

References

Korean feminine given names